Reginald Hazeltine Bassett (September 3, 1878 – April 24, 1951) was an American composer and orchestrator who led a prolific career in film.  He contributed music to over one hundred major movies from the 1920s to the 1940s.  He is virtually unknown because he worked under a film studio system that not only controlled the copyrights to his music but also allowed others to take screen credit for his work.

Bassett worked collaboratively on film score compositions with other Hollywood composers from Ira Gershwin to Hugo Friedhofer:

In any event, Friedhofer talks at length about Bassett in his oral history, mentioning the scores on which he worked with him (including Intermezzo and Gone With the Wind) and Bassett's association with Forbstein's predecessor at Warner Bros., Lou Silvers.

Extant filmography

Music department 

 Delicious (1931) (orchestrator) (uncredited)
 Igloo (1932) (composer: stock music) (uncredited)
 Bird of Paradise (1932) (orchestrator) (uncredited)
 My Lips Betray (1933) (orchestrator) (uncredited)
 Flying Down to Rio (1933) (music arranger) (uncredited)
 Midnight (1934) (composer: stock music) (uncredited); aka Call It Murder (USA: reissue title)
 Chained (1934) (orchestrator) (uncredited)
 Sequoia (1934) (orchestrator) (uncredited)... aka Malibu
 
 The Night Is Young (1935) (orchestrator) (uncredited)
 Charlie Chan in Paris (1935) (composer: stock music) (uncredited)
 The Casino Murder Case (1935) (orchestrator) (uncredited)
 Baby Face Harrington (1935) (orchestrator) (uncredited)
 Uncivil Warriors (1935) (composer: stock music) (uncredited)
 One Frightened Night (1935) (composer: stock music) (uncredited)
 Charlie Chan in Egypt (1935) (composer: stock music) (uncredited)
 Mad Love (1935) (composer: title music) (uncredited); aka The Hands of Orlac (UK)
 Undersea Kingdom (1936) (composer: stock music) (uncredited)
 Adventure in Manhattan (1936) (composer: stock music) (uncredited); aka Manhattan Madness (UK)
 The Garden of Allah (1936) (orchestrator) (uncredited)
 
 Legion of Terror (1936) (composer: stock music) (uncredited)
 Theodora Goes Wild (1936) (composer: stock music) (uncredited)
 Stampede (1936) (composer: stock music) (uncredited)
 Two-Fisted Sheriff (1937) (composer: stock music) (uncredited)
 S.O.S. Coast Guard (1937) (composer: stock music) (uncredited)
 
 The Adventures of Robin Hood (1938) (orchestrator) (uncredited); aka Robin Hood (Australia: TV title)
 City Streets (1938) (composer: stock music) (uncredited)
 The Man They Could Not Hang (1939) (composer: stock music) (uncredited)
 
 
 Gone with the Wind (1939) (orchestrator) (uncredited)
 The Yearling (1946) (orchestrator) (uncredited)
 
 Beyond the Purple Hills (it) (1950) (composer: stock music) (uncredited)
 The Big Gusher (1951) (composer: stock music) (uncredited)
 The Rough, Tough West (1952) (composer: stock music) (uncredited)
 Saginaw Trail (1953) (composer: stock music) (uncredited)

Family 
Reginald Hazeltine Bassett was born September 3, 1878, in Oakland, California, to the marriage of James Madison Bassett (1830–1903) and Carrie Hazeltine (maiden; 1958–1943).  He was married three times.
 Bassett first married on January 22, 1905, in Monterey, California, to Alyse Lourdes Hunt (maiden; 1880–1969), her first of four marriages.  They divorced July 25, 1906, in San Francisco.
 Bassett married again on April 19, 1912, in Oakland, California, to Rosina E. McIntosh (maiden; 1891—1973), her first of two marriages.  They divorced in 1916 in San Francisco.
 Bassett then married on July 25, 1927, in Santa Ana, California, to Estelle Carlton Day (maiden; 1885–1951), her third marriage.  Estelle predeceased Reginald by  days.

References 

American film score composers
American male film score composers
1878 births
1951 deaths